Aurelios Zopyros of Athens is the last reported athlete at the Ancient Olympic Games before the banning by Theodosius I in AD393. He was victor in "junior boxing" in 385. His brother Eukarpidês was also an Olympic pankratiast winner in 381.

References

Roman-era Olympic competitors
Roman-era Athenians
Ancient Greek boxers
Greek male boxers
4th-century Byzantine people